Erin Smith is a Northern Irish international lawn & indoor bowler.

Bowls career
In 2011 she won the fours bronze medal at the Atlantic Bowls Championships and in 2015 she won the triples gold medal at the Atlantic Bowls Championships.

She was selected as part of the Northern Ireland team for the 2018 Commonwealth Games on the Gold Coast in Queensland.

References

Living people
Female lawn bowls players from Northern Ireland
Year of birth missing (living people)
Bowls players at the 2018 Commonwealth Games
Commonwealth Games competitors for Northern Ireland